Shehab Kankoune (born 28 April 1981) is a Kuwaiti footballer who plays for Kazma Sporting Club in the Kuwaiti Premier League. He is a goalkeeper.

Kankoune played for Kuwait at the 2000 Summer Olympics in Sydney.

References

External links
 
 

Living people
1981 births
Kuwaiti footballers
Kuwait international footballers
Olympic footballers of Kuwait
Footballers at the 2000 Summer Olympics
2000 AFC Asian Cup players
2004 AFC Asian Cup players
Footballers at the 2002 Asian Games
Al-Sulaibikhat SC players
Sportspeople from Kuwait City
Association football goalkeepers
Asian Games competitors for Kuwait
Al-Yarmouk SC (Kuwait) players
Kazma SC players
Al-Arabi SC (Kuwait) players
Kuwait Premier League players
Al-Fahaheel FC players
Al Tadhamon SC players